USS Chatelain (DE-149) was an  in service with the United States Navy from 1943 to 1946. She was finally scrapped in 1974.

History
She was named in honor of Hubert Paul Chatelain who was awarded a Silver Star posthumously for his valiant actions before he was killed in action 26 October 1942 during the Battle of the Santa Cruz Islands.

Chatelain (DE-149) was launched 21 April 1943 by Consolidated Steel Corp. of Orange, Texas; sponsored by Mrs. L. T. Chatelain; commissioned 22 September 1943 and reported to the Atlantic Fleet.

Battle of the Atlantic
 
During the last year of the European war, while operating with the Guadalcanal group, Chatelain joined in the sinking of two German submarines, and the capture of a third.

Sinking of the German submarine U-515
Her first action took place 9 April 1944, as her group sailed from Casablanca to the United States.  was detected when her radio transmissions were picked up, and planes and ships of the task group pressed home a firm attack.

Capturing the German submarine U-505
 
On 4 June 1944, Chatelain had the distinction of initiating one of the most dramatic incidents of the war, when she made a sound contact, and hurled a barrage of hedgehogs at a U-boat. A second attack by Chatelain, this time with depth charges, holed s outer hull and forced her to surface, her crew jumping overboard as she broke water. Now the task group seized its chance to carry out the boarding operation it had been planning for months, for the first capture by Americans of an intact German submarine. Successful in taking control of the submarine and executing the damage control that made its towing practicable, the group was awarded the Presidential Unit Citation for this action.

Sinking of German submarine U-546
 
In one of the last antisubmarine actions of the Atlantic war, Chatelain took part in a 12-hour hunt for the submarine which had torpedoed  on 24 April 1945.

End-of-war decommissioning
 
Chatelain had patrol and convoy escort duty, as well as serving as plane guard during aviation exercises, until 20 November 1945, when she arrived at Charleston, South Carolina. She was decommissioned and placed in reserve at Green Cove Springs, Florida on 14 June 1946.

Awards
 
In addition to the Presidential Unit Citation, Chatelain received five battle stars for World War II service.

References

External links

NavSource Online: Destroyer Escort Photo Archive – USS CHATELAIN DE-149
 

Edsall-class destroyer escorts
World War II frigates and destroyer escorts of the United States
Ships built in Orange, Texas
1943 ships